Andy Sipes (sometimes credited as Andrew Sipes) is a writer, actor, editor, producer and art director.

Career
Andy Sipes is an editor and actor, known for Dallas & Robo (2018), Supercon (2018) and Code Monkeys (2007).

As an actor, Sipes' voice can be heard on the G4 animated series Code Monkeys as the insane Texan Mr. Larrity, as well as Mr. Larrity's idiot son, Dean.  He also played a number of different characters on Adult Swim's Minoriteam, including Larry Bird.  Andy can be seen playing Stromulus Guandor, Birdbat Leader (voiced by Carlos Alazraqui), on the Adult Swim series Saul of the Mole Men. From 2006 to 2008 he made appearances on NBC's Last Call with Carson Daly, usually playing a crude slob or one of Carson Daly's buddies. Andy Sipes provided multiple voices on Trip Tank, a show he also wrote, produced and directed.

As editor Sipes' has worked on the FX series Archer, Chozen, Unsupervised and Minoriteam.

In 2018, along with Dana Snyder, Sipes wrote the Sony Pictures film Supercon. Previously Snyder and Sipes had worked together to create two Adult Swim web series, Sipes Stories and Songs For Helping.

Andy Sipes was the executive producer of the 2018 YouTube series Dallas and Robo. The show was listed as one of the "10 Best Short-Lived Shows Of The Decade" by Forbes.com.

Filmography

Film

Television

Web

References

External links

Living people
1975 births
American male voice actors